Rondi Anne Reed (born October 26, 1952) is an American actress of stage and screen. A longtime member of Chicago's Steppenwolf Theatre Company, she has appeared in more than 50 productions at that theater. Also active on Broadway, she won the 2008 Tony Award for Best Performance by a Featured Actress in a Play for her portrayal of Mattie Fae Aiken in August: Osage County. She is best known for the role of Peggy on the television sitcom Mike & Molly which she played from 2010-2016.

Early life
Reed was born in Dixon, Illinois. She graduated from Illinois State University in 1977. She then met a Broadway theatrical producer named Stephen Eich in 1976 during her time in Steppenwolf Theater and married him in 1982. They divorced in 2016, after being married for 34 years.

Career
Reed has been a member of Chicago's Steppenwolf Theatre Company for many years, appearing in 51 productions with the company. She appeared on Broadway in The Rise and Fall of Little Voice in 1994 and The Grapes of Wrath in 1990, among others. On July 13, 2005, she originated the role of Madame Morrible in the Chicago production of the musical Wicked.

She originated the role of Mattie Fae Aiken in the Broadway production of August: Osage County in 2007, for which she won the 2008 Tony Award for Best Performance by a Featured Actress in a Play.

She later reprised her role of Madame Morrible in Wicked in Chicago, beginning June 27, 2008. Her second run ended November 18, 2008 and she was again replaced by Robertson. She then reprised her role as Mattie Fae Aiken in the London production of August: Osage Country before returning to Madame Morrible in the Broadway production of Wicked. She began performances March 17, 2009,<ref>Bacalzo, Dan (February 24, 2009). [http://www.theatermania.com/broadway/news/02-2009/rondi-reed-to-be-broadway-wickeds-new-madame-morri_17747.html "Rondi Reed to Be Broadway 'Wickeds New Madame Morrible"]. theatermania.com.</ref> replacing Jayne Houdyshell and bowed out as the evil headmistress on June 27, 2010, to star in the Australian production of August in Sydney. The limited engagement of the show ran from August 13-September 25, 2010. She returned to the New York production of "Wicked" from July 31, 2017 to January 28, 2018.

She appeared in the Seinfeld episode "The Kiss Hello" (originally aired on February 16, 1995). She starred on the CBS sitcom Mike & Molly, as Peggy Biggs, Mike's mother. She also appeared on Roseanne'' as Jackie's therapist.

Filmography

References

External links

Interview at Broadway.com

1952 births
Living people
American stage actresses
Actresses from Illinois
People from Dixon, Illinois
Illinois State University alumni
Steppenwolf Theatre Company players
21st-century American women